Pirro Gonzaga (1505–1529) was a Roman Catholic cardinal. He was the third son of Ludovico (son of Ludovico "Il Turco"), second Conte di Rodigo con Rivalta, Signore di Sabbioneta, Correggioverde, Pomponesco, Gazzuolo and Belforte; and Francesca, daughter of Gian Luigi Fieschi, Conte di Lavagna. He was a cousin of Cardinal Ercole Gonzaga.

At the age of 22, on 5 September 1527, Pirro was given the Bishopric of Modena by Pope Clement VII, while the Pope was still being held prisoner in the Castel S. Angelo, and was being supported by the efforts of Pirro's elder brother, Luigi Gonzaga (Ludovico "Rodomonte"). Once Pope Clement was released, Luigi conducted him from the Castel S. Angelo to his refuge in Orvieto.

Pirro Gonzaga was created a cardinal by Pope Clement VII in the Consistory of 21 November 1527, which was held in the Castel S. Angelo; on 27 January 1528 he was assigned as his titular church the Deaconry of S. Agata in Suburra. 

He was never consecrated a bishop, being below the canonical minimum age of 27 for consecration as a bishop. According to Vicente Fontana, in his Teatro Dominicano, the diocese of Modena was administered by a suffragan bishop, Vincenzo Cevola, O.P., titular Bishop of Hierapolis.

Gonzaga died on 28 January 1529, at the family estate at Sabbioneta, north-northwest of Modena.

References

Sources

1505 births
1529 deaths
16th-century Italian cardinals
16th-century Italian Roman Catholic bishops